Cédric Roussel (born 6 January 1978) is a Belgian former professional footballer who played as a forward.

Career

Early career
In 1997, Roussel took part in the FIFA World Youth Championship. In the season that followed the tournament, he was promoted to the Gent senior team.

Coventry City
Roussel signed a season-long loan deal for Premier League club Coventry City on 12 October 1999. He made his debut on 16 October, during the 4–1 win over Newcastle United, coming on as a late substitute for Gary McAllister. On  22 November 1999 he scored his first goal for the club, a header against Aston Villa at Highfield Road. Having impressed during his initial loan spell, Coventry signed Roussel in January 2000 for a fee of £1.2 million, despite "substantial" bids from Leeds United and Tottenham Hotspur. He finished his first season in the Premier League with six goals, including two goals in the 3–2 defeat to Manchester United in February 2000. Roussel also formed a successful strike partnership with young Irishman Robbie Keane. However, the following season he began to struggle on the goalscoring front, owing partly to injury setbacks.

Midway through January 2001, with Coventry struggling in the league, a number of bids were made for Roussel's services, including one from Wimbledon. After refusing to sign for Wimbledon, he criticized the Coventry board for trying to use him as a makeweight in a deal to bring John Hartson to the club. He was particularly critical of the club's chairman Bryan Richardson for forcing through the Wimbledon transfer, accusing him of not repaying the loyalty Roussel himself had shown in signing permanently for the club, despite interest from "several classier clubs." Roussel would however later describe his time at Coventry as "the best part of my career."

Wolverhampton Wanderers
Roussel was eventually sold a few weeks later to the First Division club Wolverhampton Wanderers, in a £2 million deal. Generally disappointing at Molineux, he left after 18 months, having scored two goals in twenty five appearances. He was loaned out for the 2002-03 season to his hometown club Mons, who had recently been promoted to the Belgian Pro League. He finished the season as the division's joint top scorer with Wesley Sonck; both players scored 22 goals.

Genk and Rubin Kazan
His goalscoring form attracted interest from bigger clubs in the league and Roussel signed for Genk in 2003. His reputation in Belgian football increased and he made his first appearance for the Belgium national team in 2003. After just one season at Genk, in which he scored on thirteen occasions, he moved on again, this time signing for Rubin Kazan in Russia.

Standard Liège, Zulte Waregem and Brescia
Roussel never felt at home in Russia and returned to Belgium to play for Standard Liège. At Standard he struggled to break into the first team and after two unsuccessful years at the club he signed for Zulte Waregem. His time there was again short-lived and a year later he signed for Italian Serie B club Brescia. Roussel soon found himself frozen out at Brescia, and the club became open to offers for him.

In August 2007, he spent a week on trial with Scottish Premier League club Dundee United but returned home without signing the agreed loan deal.

Return to Mons
He instead chose to return to his former club Mons, where he signed a three-year contract.

In the lower leagues
On 25 November 2010, Roussel agreed with Dutch side HSV Hoek to play in the Topklasse. In August 2011 he moved to RUS Beloeil in Belgium.

On 13 February 2015, Roussel announced his retirement from football at the age of 37.

Outside football
Roussel has a son Cameron (born 2001) with former girlfriend Kirsty Wood.

Following his retirement from football, Roussel began a career in real estate.

References

External links
 
 
 

1978 births
Living people
Footballers from Hainaut (province)
Belgian footballers
Belgium international footballers
Belgium youth international footballers
Belgium under-21 international footballers
Association football forwards
Belgian Pro League players
Premier League players
Russian Premier League players
Serie B players
R.A.A. Louviéroise players
RAAL La Louvière players
K.A.A. Gent players
Coventry City F.C. players
Wolverhampton Wanderers F.C. players
R.A.E.C. Mons players
K.R.C. Genk players
FC Rubin Kazan players
Standard Liège players
S.V. Zulte Waregem players
Brescia Calcio players
Belgian expatriate footballers
Belgian expatriate sportspeople in England
Expatriate footballers in England
Belgian expatriate sportspeople in Russia
Expatriate footballers in Russia
Belgian expatriate sportspeople in Italy
Expatriate footballers in Italy
Sportspeople from Mons
Expatriate footballers in Cyprus
Belgian expatriate sportspeople in Cyprus
AEK Larnaca FC players